Eillo (1980–1984) was an American Champion Thoroughbred racehorse who won the inaugural running of the Breeders' Cup Sprint in 1984. The name Eillo is Crown Stable owner Ollie Cohen's first name spelled in reverse.

Eillo was struck with a bout of colic and died at age four following surgery just four weeks after his win in the Breeders' Cup. The Eillo Stakes at Monmouth Park Racetrack was named in his memory.

References
 Eillo's pedigree and partial racing stats

1980 racehorse births
1984 racehorse deaths
Racehorses bred in Florida
Racehorses trained in the United States
Eclipse Award winners
Breeders' Cup Sprint winners
Thoroughbred family 12-b